is a 2017 Japanese jidaigeki action comedy film written and directed by , starring Shun Oguri and based on the manga series of the same name written and illustrated by Hideaki Sorachi. It was released on July 14, 2017, in Japan by Warner Bros. Pictures. The theme song for the film was titled "DECIDED" by UVERworld.

Plot
Yorozuya receives two similar and ultimately connected jobs: Elizabeth needs Odd Jobs to find Katsura, and a swordsmith needs the crew to find a dangerous sword named Benizakura. There is more to both requests than Gintoki and his friends thought.

Cast
Shun Oguri as Gintoki Sakata
Masaki Suda as Shinpachi Shimura
Kanna Hashimoto as Kagura
Yuya Yagira as Toshiro Hijikata
Hirofumi Arai as Nizo Okada
Ryo Yoshizawa as Sougo Okita
Akari Hayami as Tetsuko Murata
Tsuyoshi Muro as Gengai Hiraga
Masami Nagasawa as Tae Shimura
Masaki Okada as Kotaro Katsura
Mikako Takahashi as the voice of Sadaharu
Kōichi Yamadera as the voice of Shoyo Yoshida
Takayuki Yamada as the voice of Elizabeth
Seiji Rokkaku as Char Aznable
Jiro Sato as Henpeita Takechi
Nanao as Matako Kijima
Seika Furuhata as Christel Ketsuno
Ken Yasuda as Tetsuya Murata
Nakamura Kankurō VI as Isao Kondo
Tsuyoshi Dōmoto as Shinsuke Takasugi

Production
Principal photography took place in July, August and early September 2016. On the New Year's Day 2017, they celebrated it with a little song and dance routine by the main casts of the film. Encore Films announced on January 3, 2017, it will release the film alongside Tokyo Ghoul in Malaysia, Singapore, and Indonesia in mid-2017. On March 22, 2017, they revealed on set photos which had taken in Ibaraki Prefecture on August 24, 2016. On May 15, 2017, the staff of the film revealed that Galigali Galixon would appear in that film. On May 29, the staff confirmed to replace the scenes which Galixon appears in the film due to being arrested on May 12. Later, Encore Films confirmed the Singaporean release on July 13, 2017.

Box office
The film grossed  in Japan, making it the third highest-grossing domestic film of 2017. Overseas, the film grossed  in China,  in Hong Kong, $45,128 in Thailand, and $228,569 in South Korea, Australia and New Zealand.

Awards

Web series
A drama was released as extra material, adapting "The Okita Mitsuba Arc" from the manga and anime, with many of the original cast from the film, including Shun Oguri and most of The Shinsengumi live action portrayals.

Sequel
A sequel,  was released on August 17, 2018. Most of the actors from the first movie played the same role in the sequel. New cast members included Haruma Miura as Kamotaro Ito, Masataka Kubota as Bansai Kawakami and Midoriko Kimura as Otose.

References

External links
  
  at Well Go USA
 

Gintama
Films directed by Yūichi Fukuda
Live-action films based on manga
2010s Japanese films
2010s Japanese-language films
Jidaigeki films
Japanese action comedy films
2017 action comedy films
Warner Bros. films
2017 comedy films